, formerly NKSJ Holdings and , is a Japanese insurance company. It is the second-largest property insurance company in Japan only behind Tokio Marine, with market share of 19.3% in 2007.

The “Sompo” in the company's name means  in Japanese, though Sompo Japan offers a range of financial services including life insurance, securities, asset management and venture capital businesses.

History
Tokyo Fire Insurance Company, Ltd. was established in 1887 as Japan's first fire insurance company. The company worked to cultivate an awareness of fire insurance, and five branch offices were added within a year. The major Yokosuka fire of 1890, however, nearly toppled the fledgling company.

In 1893, Japanese entrepreneur Zenjiro Yasuda absorbed the Tokyo Fire Insurance Company into the Yasuda zaibatsu.  Later, in 1944, Tokyo Fire Insurance, Imperial Marine Insurance, and First Engine & Boiler Insurance merged to become the Yasuda Fire & Marine Insurance Company (安田火災海上保険).

Yasuda Fire made a successful bid for Van Gogh's "Sunflower" paintings for about 5.3 billion yen in 1987.

On July 1, 2002, Yasuda Fire and Nissan Fire & Marine Insurance (日産火災海上保険) merged into a new company, Sompo Japan Insurance Inc.

In December 2002, Sompo Japan acquired Taisei Fire & Marine Insurance.

In September 2014, Sompo Japan acquired Nipponkoa Insurance.

In December 2022, the heirs to the Jewish banker and art collector Paul von Mendelsohn-Bartholdly filed suit in Chicago to reclaim the Van Gogh, alleging that the insurance company ignored the Holocaust-linked history of the painting during its acquisition in 1987.

International operations 
Sompo Japan Nipponkoa has offices and subsidiaries in 28 countries, providing insurance services and risk management expertise.

Asia Pacific 

In 1991, PGA Yasuda Insurance Company, Inc., was established in Partnership with Prudential Guarantee and Assurance Inc. In September 2014, upon acquisition of Nippon Koa, it is now named PGA Sompo Insurance Corporation.

In June 2005, Sompo Japan established Sompo Japan Insurance (China) Co., Ltd. in Dalian, China.

Sompo Japan's Australian branch has more than 35 years of operating history.

In 2007, Sompo Japan developed its business in Malaysia by purchasing a 30% stake of Berjaya General Insurance Bhd, now Berjaya Sompo Insurance.

In 2008, Sompo Japan established a joint venture with Karnataka Bank, Indian Overseas Bank and Allahabad Bank (Which later merged with Indian Bank and Dabur Investment Corp. in India, Universal Sompo General Insurance (main office in Mumbai).

Europe 
Sompo Japan has been serving clients in Europe for about 50 years with offices in the United Kingdom, Belgium, France, Germany, Italy, the Netherlands, Spain and Turkey. Sompo Japan Insurance Company of Europe, a corporate member of Lloyd's of London since 1993, conducts underwriting and provides claim settlement, risk management and insurance information mainly to Japanese companies.

In April 2014, Sompo concluded the purchase of specialist Lloyd's of London market company Canopius Group for £594m.

Americas 
Through its subsidiary Sompo Japan Insurance Company of America, headquartered in New York, Sompo Japan conducts property and casualty insurance operations in the United States and Canada. Sompo Japan Insurance De Mexico S.A. de C.V. started local operation in Mexico in 1998.

In South America, Sompo Japan's main base of operations is its subsidiary in Brazil, Yasuda Seguros S.A., established in 1958. The majority of Yasuda Seguros clients are local businesses and individuals.

Update - October 2016

Sompo Japan Nipponkoa has completed its acquisition of Bermuda-based insurer Endurance and will integrate it into its newly launched, fully integrated re/insurance platform in Bermuda, named Sompo International.

The new organization will have a board of its own, led by John Charman as chairman and CEO. He will report to Sompo CEO Kengo Sakurada. Charman was chairman and CEO of Endurance prior to its acquisition.

In October 2016, Sompo announced the initiation of processes to buy 100% of Endurance for the sum of US$6.3 billion. Endurance was delisted from the New York Stock Exchange upon completion of the transaction.

List of Group Companies

Domestic P&C Insurance 

 Sompo Japan Nipponkoa Insurance Inc.
 SAISON AUTOMOBILE AND FIRE INSURANCE COMPANY, LIMITED
 Sompo Japan Nipponkoa DC Securities Inc.
 Sompo Risk Management Inc.
 Mysurance Inc.

Overseas Insurance 

 AYA SOMPO Insurance
 SOMPO INTERNATIONAL
 SOMPO SiGORTA
 Sompo Holdings (Asia) Pte. Ltd.
 Berjaya Sompo Insurance Berhad
 PT. SOMPO INSURANCE INDONESIA
 Sompo Insurance Singapore Pte. Ltd.
 SOMPO HONG KONG
 SOMPO CHINA
 SOMPO SEGUROS
 SOMPO SAÜDE
 Universal Sompo General Insurance Company Limited
 PGA Sompo Insurance Corporation
 Sompo Insurance (Thailand) Public Company Limited
 United Insurance Company of Vietnam
 Sompo Consulting Korea Inc.
 SOMPO Taiwan Brokers Co., Ltd.
 Eterna Insurance Company Limited

Domestic Life Insurance 

 Sompo Japan Nipponkoa Himawari Life Insurance, Inc.

Nursing Care & Healthcare Business 

 Sompo Care Inc.

Strategic Businesses 

 SOMPO JAPAN NIPPONKOA ASSET MANAGEMENT CO., LTD.
 Prime Assistance Inc.
 FRESHHOUSE Co., Ltd.
 Sompo Warranty Inc.
 Sompo Health Support Inc.
 Wellness Communications Corporation

References 

 Sompo Japan Annual Report 2008

External links

Sompo Japan Nipponkoa
Sompo Japan Insurance de Mexico
Sompo Japan Nipponkoa Museum of art

Insurance companies based in Tokyo
Japanese brands
Financial services companies established in 1887
Japanese companies established in 1887
Fuyo Group
Furukawa Group
Midori-kai